Bernard Street is a thoroughfare in Leith, Edinburgh, Scotland. It runs west north westerly from the junction of Constitution Street and Baltic Street to meet the Water of Leith at The Shore.  It forms the northern boundary of what was known in the 19th century as 'Old Leith'.

Overview

Whilst some sources claim the street is named after innkeeper Bernard Lindsay who was granted the barony of the area by King James VI in 1779 this is clearly an error as the street is named St Bernard Street in the 1777 plan of Leith, linking the concentric street names of St  Giles Street and St Andrew Street. The second issue in the theory is that, if true, it should have led to its being named Lindsay Street.

In 1780, the first public sewer in Scotland was built in Bernard Street, flowing into the Water of Leith. The iron seal of the sewer is still visible by the bridge at the end of Bernard Street.

At the east end of the street is a statue of Robert Burns by David Watson Stevenson erected in 1898. Other buildings include the premises of Leith Merchants Club and the former home of the Leith Banking Company. Today, the buildings of Bernard Street have been converted to use as pubs, cafes and the offices of media, marketing and publishing companies.

From the mid-18th century, a stagecoach service ran from Bernard Street to the city's Old Town. Bernard Street forms part of the main coastal route around north Edinburgh. From the 1970s until the 1990s a Bernard Street bypass was proposed, Taking traffic northward through the docks and closing the street to through traffic at its east end. This was then to preserve Bernard Street as a historic enclave. 

Bernard Street was a stop on Leith's electric tram line from 1905 until 1955 and will have a tram stop as part of the new Edinburgh Trams development for which construction commenced in 2020. It is thought that the stop, to be located at the junction of Bernard Street and Constitution Street will be known as 'Port of Leith'.

Buildings of Interest

Kings Wark - 1702 with silhouette of the former forestair on its north flank
Currie Line offices - lead roofed building at centre of north side
Former Norwegian consulate/Christian Salvesen HQ - south side, west of domed bank
Waterloo Buildings - huge tenement of 1816
Leith Bank 1806 - by John Paterson

See also
 Edinburgh Street Tramways

References

External links
Edinburgh Trams
Bernard Street information

Streets in Edinburgh
Leith
Proposed Edinburgh Trams stops